WGBS may refer to:

 WGBS-LD, a low-power television station (channel 11) licensed to serve Hampton, Virginia, United States
 WAQI, a radio station (710 AM) licensed to serve Miami, Florida, United States, which used the call sign WGBS until October 1985
 WINS (AM), a radio station (1010 AM) licensed to serve New York, New York, United States, which formerly used the call sign WGBS
 WLTV, a television station (channel 23 analog/24 digital) licensed to serve Miami, Florida, which used the call sign WGBS-TV from 1956 to 1968
 WPSG, a television station (channel 57 analog/32 digital) licensed to serve Philadelphia, Pennsylvania, United States, which used the call sign WGBS-TV from October 1985 to December 1995
 WGBS, a fictional television station depicted in DC Comics publications
 Watford Grammar School for Boys, in Watford, Hertfordshire, United Kingdom
 Whole genome bisulfite sequencing, a NGS technology to determine DNA methylation